Ammassalimmi Timersoqatigiiffik Ammassak (also known as A.T.A.) is a sports and football club from Greenland, based in Tasiilaq. Their association football team did not appear in the 2007 edition of the island's top league, the Greenlandic Men's Football Championship, despite finishing in 4th place in 2006. The club has not played any season since then.

External links
 Club website

Football clubs in Greenland
Association football clubs established in 1960
1960 establishments in Greenland